Dave Butler (born ) is an American businessman and former professional basketball player. He is the co-chief executive officer (CEO) of Dimensional Fund Advisors, a global investment firm based in Austin, Texas.

Basketball

High School and College

Butler played basketball at Rolling Hills High School in Rolling Hills Estates in Los Angeles County, California.  His father and brother were alumni of Loyola Marymount University, who recruited Butler to play college basketball. However, Butler chose to play for the California Golden Bears.

Butler began his Cal career being named the Pac-10 Freshman of the Year in 1983. Under first-year coach Lou Campanelli, the Bears qualified for the 1986 NIT, the school's first postseason appearance since 1960. Butler led the team  that season in rebounding with 7.9 per game, and was second in scoring (11.8) behind Kevin Johnson. Earlier that season on January 25, 1986, Butler had 23 points and 10 rebounds in one of the best games in his career, as the Bears won 75–67 to snap a 52-game losing streak to the UCLA Bruins.

Cal returned to the NIT in 1987, advancing to the quarterfinals. Butler finished his career at Cal with the school record for games started (113), and also left fourth in Cal history in career rebounds (814) and seventh in scoring (1,291).

Butler graduated with a Bachelor of Science in marketing and finance in 1986, and was a Rhodes Scholar candidate. He was inducted into the Cal Athletic Hall of Fame in 2011, and named to the Pac-12 Hall of Honor in 2014.

Professional

A  forward, Butler was drafted by the Boston Celtics of National Basketball Association (NBA) in the fifth round of the 1987 NBA Draft, but chose to play professionally in Turkey. In his only season there in Istanbul, he suffered a major calf injury that basically eliminated any possibility of him playing in the NBA. He played one more year in Japan with the Isuzu Motors Lynx.

Post-basketball career

Butler returned to Cal and earned a Master of Business Administration (MBA) at the Haas School of Business in 1990. He worked with Merrill Lynch for three years before joining Dimensional Fund Advisors in 1995.

Prior to being named Co-CEO in 2017, Butler led the firm's global financial services group. In the 25 years since he joined Dimensional, the firm's assets under management have grown from roughly $10 billion to over $450 billion.

Personal life
Butler's younger brother, Greg, played college basketball for Cal's rival, Stanford, before also playing professionally in the NBA.

References

1960s births
Year of birth uncertain
Living people
Basketball players from California
American men's basketball players
Forwards (basketball)
California Golden Bears men's basketball players
Haas School of Business alumni
Boston Celtics draft picks
Akita Isuzu/Isuzu Motors Lynx/Giga Cats players
American expatriate basketball people in Japan
American expatriate basketball people in Turkey